Kenix Kwok Ho-ying (born 27 November 1970) is a Hong Kong actress with family roots in Zhongshan, Guangdong, China. Along with Maggie Cheung Ho-yee, Ada Choi, Flora Chan and Jessica Hsuan, Kenix is known as one of the Top 5 "Fa Dans" (花旦) (term used for actresses with high popularity) of TVB from the mid-1990s to mid-2000s.

Career
Kwok got her start as a finalist in the Top 5 of the 1993 Miss Hong Kong Pageant. Though considered a favourite to win, having won two side awards including Media's Favourite and Potential Artist, she lost to Mok Hoi Yan. Consequently, Kwok did not even make it to the Top 3. 
 
Kenix went on to star in several high-rated drama series including A Kindred Spirit, Detective Investigation Files I-III, At the Threshold of An Era I-II, and recently Shine on You, Love Bond, Revolving Doors of Vengeance and Ten Brothers.

In late 2006, Kenix began filming "Red Powder," a series for mainland China with Julian Cheung. The series was released in 2007 in China. Kenix was paid an estimated HK$2.5 million for this series.

In 2008, Kenix signed on to STYLE Model Agency. Her job scope would mainly include modeling in roadshows. She is also allowed to film drama series under her contract with this agency.

On 23 August 2008, Kenix told reporters in an interview over the phone that she would be filming a new 40-episode TVB drama series after two years of rest from filming any TVB series. She said she accepted the role offered to her as she felt the script was very good and TVB was very sincere in asking her to come back (she got a pay rise and two of TVB's top executives personally invited her back to TVB). The filming would commence in November 2008. She would star alongside Gallen Lo, Lui Leong Wai and Anita Yuen. The said series was Born Rich.

Personal life
Kwok began dating Hong Kong actor Frankie Lam in 1994. The couple wed on 10 March 2004. The wedding was much publicised because it was a marriage involving two TVB actors. On 14 January 2010, Kwok gave birth to their first child, daughter Tania Lam Tin-yeuk.

Filmography

TV series

Films

References

External links
 Official Blog of Kenix Kwok at Sina Blog
 
 

1970 births
Living people
Hong Kong film actresses
Hong Kong television actresses
TVB veteran actors
20th-century Hong Kong actresses
21st-century Hong Kong actresses